Nigar Sultana (born 1 August 1997) is a Bangladeshi cricketer and captain of the Bangladesh women's national cricket team in the WODI and the WT20I formats. She is a wicketkeeper and right hand batter who bats in the middle order.

Biography
In June 2018, she was part of Bangladesh's squad that won their first ever Women's Asia Cup title, winning the 2018 Women's Twenty20 Asia Cup tournament. Later the same month, she was named in Bangladesh's squad for the 2018 ICC Women's World Twenty20 Qualifier tournament.

In October 2018, she was named in Bangladesh's squad for the 2018 ICC Women's World Twenty20 tournament in the West Indies. In August 2019, she was named in Bangladesh's squad for the 2019 ICC Women's World Twenty20 Qualifier tournament in Scotland. In October 2019, she was named in the Women's Global Development Squad, ahead of a five-match series in Australia. In November 2019, she was named in Bangladesh's squad for the cricket tournament at the 2019 South Asian Games. The Bangladesh team beat Sri Lanka by two runs in the final to win the gold medal.

In January 2020, she was named in Bangladesh's squad for the 2020 ICC Women's T20 World Cup in Australia. She was the leading run-scorer for Bangladesh in the tournament, with 114 runs in four matches.

In November 2021, she was named as the captain of Bangladesh's team for the 2021 Women's Cricket World Cup Qualifier tournament in Zimbabwe. In January 2022, she was named as the captain of Bangladesh's team for the 2022 Commonwealth Games Cricket Qualifier tournament in Malaysia. Later the same month, she was named as the captain of Bangladesh's team for the 2022 Women's Cricket World Cup in New Zealand.

References

External links

 
 

1997 births
Living people
Bangladeshi women cricketers
Bangladesh women Twenty20 International cricketers
Bangladesh women One Day International cricketers
South Asian Games gold medalists for Bangladesh
South Asian Games medalists in cricket
Mymensingh Division women cricketers
Western Zone women cricketers
Wicket-keepers
People from Mymensingh